Ahmadpur is a village located in Kapurthala district, Punjab. The village is administrated by a Sarpanch, who is an elected representative.

Demography 
As per Population Census 2011, the Ahmadpur village has population of 714 of which 360 are males while 354 are females. The village is administrated by Sarpanch an elected representative of the village. Literacy rate of Ahmadpur is 92.49%, higher than state average of 75.84% of Punjab.  The population of children under the age of 6 years is 48 which is 6.72% of total population of Ahmadpur, and child sex ratio is approximately 714 lower than Punjab average of 846.

As per census 2011, 243 people were engaged in work activities out of the total population of Ahmadpur which includes 201 males and 42 females.  According to census survey report 2011, 83.54% workers describe their work as main work and 16.46% workers are involved in Marginal activity providing livelihood for less than 6 months.

Caste  
The village has schedule caste (SC) constitutes 12.32% of total population of the village and it doesn't have any Schedule Tribe (ST) population.

Population data

Villages in Kapurthala

External links
  Villages in Kapurthala
 Kapurthala Villages List

References

Villages in Kapurthala district